Blue Mermaid is a steel-hulled Thames sailing barge constructed between 2015 and 2019. She was built specifically to operate under sail and does not carry an engine. She is a replica of an older vessel of the same name, built in 1930 but sunk by enemy action during the second world war.

Blue Mermaid (2015) 
Blue Mermaid was built to carry cargo, and in 2023 she received permission from the Maritime and Coastguard Agency to carry cargoes of up to 110 tonnes, on the Thames and along the North Sea coast between Lowestoft and Sandwich. In 1900 there were around 4,000 such barges, each with a crew of two and using just the wind and the tide, but she is the first sailing barge built for trade in Britain since 1930 and the first since the 1970s to be authorised as a commercial cargo carrier.

She has a couple of cabins aft for skipper and mate and bunks forward for five or six more crew. The hold can also be used for accommodation when it is empty. 

Blue Mermaid was built at Toms shipyard in Polruan, near Fowey in Cornwall, and launched from there as a bare hull on 28 May 2016. The vessel was towed around the coast to Maldon where she was fitted out at the Downs Road Boatyard. She will operate out of the Heybridge Basin.

Blue Mermaid belongs to the Maldon-based charity Sea Change Sailing Trust who have many years of experience taking all kinds of people sailing. Richard Titchener with his partner Hilary Halajko, runs both the barge and Sea Change Sailing Trust. They are also involved in training young people for a hands-on career in Maritime Heritage, supplying crew with heritage sail experience, essential for looking after and sailing the aging fleet of Britain's historic vessels.

Blue Mermaid (1930) 
Blue Mermaid was one of seven Thames barges built between 1925 and 1930 for F W Horlock, Mistley.

In 1924 the Horlocks commissioned seven new steel Thames barges, of which Blue Mermaid was the sixth. Six of these 'seven sisters' are still afloat: Blue Mermaid was lost to a mine in World War II. They were built at Mistley.

References

Bibliography
 
 
 

Blue Mermaid
1930 ships
Individual sailing vessels
Ships built in Mistley
Transport on the River Thames
Sailing ships of the United Kingdom